Waldley is a hamlet in Derbyshire, England.

Waldley has had many spellings, let alone pronunciations.  Pronounced as Walled-lee...  It was originally spelt as Wardley, but it is believed that the OS Mappers mis-wrote it and it then forever came Waldley.

The hamlet is part of the Derbyshire Dales constituency, and the current MP is the Conservative Sarah Dines.

External links
Waldley.com

Hamlets in Derbyshire
Derbyshire Dales